Olivais is a station on the Red Line of the Lisbon Metro. The station is located under Rua Cidade de Bissau, at the junction with Rua Cidade de Luanda.

History
The architectural design is by Rui Cardim with installation art by plastic artists Nuno de Siqueira and Cecilia de Sousa.

Connections

Urban buses

Carris 
 708 Martim Moniz ⇄ Parque das Nações Norte
 759 Restauradores ⇄ Estação Oriente (Interface)
 779 Centro Comercial dos Olivais - circulação
 781 Cais do Sodré ⇄ Prior Velho

See also
 List of Lisbon metro stations

References

External links

Red Line (Lisbon Metro) stations
Railway stations opened in 1998